The International C-Class Catamaran Championship, (ICCCC or I4C), is a  match racing sailing competition featuring the highly innovative International C-Class Catamarans, predominantly with a wingsail rather than conventional sail plan.

It is the successor event to the International Catamaran Challenge Trophy, and like it, has always been colloquially known as the "little America's Cup", despite there being no actual connection to the Americas Cup. This terminology has been contested as being trademark violation against America's Cup Properties Inc, but the name was common in use long before ACPI and its trademarks.

Race results

The 2013 ICCCC was held in Falmouth, Cornwall, UK. The event hosts were Team Invictus and the organising club was Restronguet Sailing Club
, with shore facilities provided by Windsport International
It was estimated that there were 10 teams and up to 16 competing boats. Teams are expected from Challenge Italia (Roberto Gripi), Team Hydros C Class Sailing (Switzerland) , USA (Steve Clark, Aethon & Cogito), Canada (reigning champion, Fred Eaton), Team Invictus UK, Team Cascais (Portugal), Challenge France (France) and Groupama (France).

The 2015 ICCCC was held on Lake Geneva in Geneva, Switzerland September 12-21.

See also

Americas Cup
International Catamaran Challenge Trophy

Notes

External links
2015 ICCCC Event website SUI
International C Class Catamaran Challenge 2013 Event Website GB
Team Invictus C Class Sailing GB
Canadian C Class Catamaran Home Page
Royal Canadian Yacht Club Host Club for the September 2007 ICCCC
The New "Little Americas Cup"
Article on Fred Eaton
New York Yacht Club - Host Club for the August 2010 event

International C-Class Catamaran
Match racing competitions